The 2013–14 Nashville Predators season was the club's 16th season in the National Hockey League (NHL). The Predators finished tenth in the Western Conference, failing to qualify for the Stanley Cup playoffs for the second year in a row.

Regular season
After the season ended, it was announced that head coach Barry Trotz's contract would not be extended and a search for a new head coach would begin immediately. Trotz had been offered a different role in the organization, which he declined. Trotz had been the only coach in franchise history.

Standings

Schedule and results

Pre-season

Regular season

Playoffs
The 2013-14 season was another disappointing one for the Nashville Predators as they missed the playoffs for the second consecutive year.

Player stats
Final stats 
Skaters

Goaltenders

†Denotes player spent time with another team before joining the Predators. Stats reflect time with the Predators only.
‡Traded mid-season. Stats reflect time with the Predators only.
Bold/italics denotes franchise record

Transactions 

The Predators have been involved in the following transactions during the 2013–14 season.

Trades

Free agents signed

Free agents lost

Claimed via waivers

Lost via waivers

Player signings

Draft picks

Nashville Predators' picks at the 2013 NHL Entry Draft, which was held in Newark, New Jersey on June 30, 2013.

Draft notes

 The Nashville Predators' second-round pick went to the Montreal Canadiens as the result of a February 27, 2012 trade that sent Andrei Kostitsyn to the Predators in exchange for a 2013 conditional fifth-round pick and this pick.
 The Tampa Bay Lightning's third-round pick went to the Nashville Predators as a result of a June 15, 2012 trade that sent Anders Lindback, Kyle Wilson and a 2012 seventh-round pick (#202–Nikita Gusev) to the Lightning in exchange for Sebastien Caron, two 2012 second-round picks (#37–Pontus Aberg, #50–Colton Sissons) and this pick.
 The Nashville Predators' third-round pick went to the New York Rangers as the result of a June 23, 2012 trade that sent a 2012 third-round pick (#89–Brendan Leipsic) to the Predators in exchange for this pick.
 The Buffalo Sabres' fourth-round pick went to the Nashville Predators as a result of a February 27, 2012 trade that sent a 2012 first-round pick (#21–Mark Jankowski) to the Sabres in exchange for Paul Gaustad and this pick.
 The Toronto Maple Leafs' fourth-round pick went to the St. Louis Blues as the result of a trade on June 30, 2013 that sent a seventh-round pick in 2013 (203rd overall) and a fourth-round pick in 2014 to Nashville in exchange for this pick.     Nashville previously acquired this pick as the result of a trade on July 3, 2011 that sent Cody Franson and Matthew Lombardi to Toronto in exchange for Brett Lebda, Robert Slaney and this pick (being conditional at the time of the trade). The condition – Lombardi plays in 60 or more regular season games over the course of the 2011–12 and 2012–13 NHL seasons – was converted on April 3, 2012.
 The New York Rangers' fifth-round pick went to the Nashville Predators as a result of a June 23, 2012 trade that sent a 2012 fifth-round pick (#142–Thomas Spelling) to the Rangers in exchange for this pick.
 The San Jose Sharks' sixth-round pick went to the Nashville Predators as a result of an April 3, 2013 trade that sent Scott Hannan to the Sharks in exchange for this pick.
 The St. Louis Blues' seventh-round pick went to the Nashville Predators as the result of a trade on June 30, 2013 that sent Toronto's fourth-round pick in 2013 (112th overall) to St. Louis in exchange for a fourth-round pick in 2014 and this pick.

References

Nashville Predators seasons
Nashville Predators season, 2013-14
Nash